The IBSA Blind Football Asian Championships is an multi-sport event, held biannually for Asian and Oceanic men's and women's blind football national teams. In the men's tournament, China holds a record of six titles won, making them the most successful national team at the championship. The women's tournament only started on 2022, which saw Japan earn their first title in the two-team contested edition.

Winners overview

Men's B1

Women's B1

Summary
Matches in Penalty = Draw / Exclude of Penalty Goals

Men (2005-2022)

Women (2022-2022)

Medals

Men (2005-2022)

Women (2022-2022)

Ranking

Men

Women

Results

2005
  2-1 
  1-0 
  0-0

2007
  0-0 
  2-0 
  0-0 
  4-1 
  0-1 
  0-0 
  1-0 
  3-0

2009
  1-0 
  0-3 
  1-0 
  5-0 
  0-1 
  4-1 
  0-0 
  3-0 
  3-0 
  2-1 
  0-0  (Penalty 1–0)
  2-0

2011
  2-0 
  1-1  
  1-0 
  2-1 
  2-0 
  0-0 
  2-0 
  1-0

2013
  0-0 
  2-0 
  2-0 
  0-0  (Penalty 3–2)

2015
  0-6 
  0-5 
  0-1 
  1-0 
  1-0 
  0-0 
  2-0 
  10-0 
  0-2 
  0-0 
  5-0 
  1-0 
  0-5 
  0-4 
  2-0 
  1-0 
  0-0  (Penalty 2–1)
  0-0  (Penalty 1–0)

2017
  2-1 
  3-0 
  2-0 
  3-0 
  2-2 
  4-3 
  6-0 
  1-1  (Penalty 3–2)
  2-1 
  2-0 
  2-0

2019
  5-0 
  4-0 
  6-0 
  8-0 
  10-0 
  1-0 
  4-0 
  5-0 
  1-0 
  2-0 
  0-1 
  0-0 
  0-0  (Penalty 1–0)
  3-2 
  2-2  (Penalty 3–2)
  2-0 
  2-1 
  1-0

References

Links
https://ibsasport.org/

https://blindfootball.sport/

https://blindfootball.sport/results-and-rankings/historical-results/

https://ibsasport.org/blind-football-japan-is-the-first-womens-asian-champion/

Blind sports
Paralympic association football
IBSA competitions